Liu Yunfei (born 8 May 1979) is a Chinese international football goalkeeper who currently plays for Shaanxi Warriors Beyond. Internationally he played within the 2004 AFC Asian Cup; however, at the height of his career he was disciplined by his club for his recreational drug use before being arrested for possessing illegal drugs, which saw him retire in 2007 at the age of only 27. On April 15, 2021, Liu decided to return to the field at age of 42.

Biography
Liu started his career playing for the Tianjin Teda youth team and was soon called up to the Chinese U-23 team, where he competed with his Tianjin teammate Zong Lei for the first-choice goalkeeping spot. After returning from national duty, his development soon saw him replace Jiang Jin as the club's first-choice goalkeeper within the 2001 Chinese Jia-A League season after he made 19 league appearances for the club. His breakout season saw him personally win the Jia A goalkeeper of the year award in 2001, while Jiang Jin decided to move to Shanghai Zhongyuan in 2002.

Liu was soon called up to Chinese senior team on February 15, 2002 by the Chinese Head coach Bora Milutinović in a friendly against Slovenia in a 0-0 draw. While he missed out on the 2002 FIFA World Cup, Liu soon went on to establish himself as his country's first-choice goalkeeper once Arie Haan became manager for China, and once the 2004 AFC Asian Cup came around, Liu became the hero in the semi-final penalty shootout against Iran as China won 4-3 on penalties.

Liu transferred to top tier side Shanghai Shenhua in 2006, where his teammate in the national team Yu Weiliang was a starter goalkeeper. He started a few games, but was suspended later for discipline problems thought to be brought about by his recreational drug use. After he stopped training Liu soon became a free agent after the contract with Shanghai Shenhua was terminated. In March 2007, Liu was arrested for possessing illegal drugs, so he retired at only age 27.

References

External links
Player profile at Sina

1979 births
Living people
Chinese footballers
Footballers from Tianjin
China international footballers
2004 AFC Asian Cup players
Shanghai Shenhua F.C. players
Tianjin Jinmen Tiger F.C. players
Chinese Super League players
Association football goalkeepers